Diwan Chand Sharma (8 March 1896, in Daulat Nagar, Gujrat District, British Punjab – 1969) was member of 1st Lok Sabha from Hoshiarpur (Lok Sabha constituency) in Punjab State, India.

He was elected to 2nd Lok Sabha, 3rd and 4th   from Gurdaspur (Lok Sabha constituency). He was MP from Gurdaspur from 1957–1962, 1962–1967 and 1967–1968. He was succeeded by Prabodh Chandra.

References

1896 births
India MPs 1962–1967
India MPs 1967–1970
India MPs 1957–1962
India MPs 1952–1957
Punjab, India politicians
Lok Sabha members from Punjab, India
Year of death unknown
People from Gujrat, Pakistan
Indian National Congress politicians from Punjab, India